Vincenzo La Russa (10 July 1938 – 21 November 2021) was an Italian politician. A member of the Christian Democracy party and the Christian Democratic Centre, he served in the Senate of the Republic from 1979 to 1983 and again from 1994 to 1996 as well as the Chamber of Deputies from 1983 to 1987.

References

1938 births
2021 deaths
Italian politicians
People from Paternò
Christian Democracy (Italy) politicians
Christian Democratic Centre politicians
Deputies of Legislature IX of Italy
Senators of Legislature VIII of Italy
Senators of Legislature XII of Italy